"The Best" is a song by Welsh singer Bonnie Tyler from her seventh studio album, Hide Your Heart (1988). It was written by Holly Knight and Mike Chapman. Produced by Desmond Child, Tyler's version became a top-10 hit in Norway but was a minor hit elsewhere.

In 1989, American singer Tina Turner released a cover version of "The Best" for her seventh studio album, Foreign Affair. It became an international chart hit, reaching Platinum certification in the UK. In 1992, Turner re-recorded the track as a duet with Australian singer Jimmy Barnes.

Bonnie Tyler version

Background and release
"The Best" was co-written by Mike Chapman and Holly Knight, and first offered to Paul Young, who declined. Bonnie Tyler was the first artist to record it. "The Best" was released as the lead single from her seventh studio album, Hide Your Heart, in January 1988. It peaked at no. 10 in Norway, and no. 25 in Finland, but only spent one week in the UK Singles Chart at no. 95. In Italy, "The Best" peaked at no. 8 on Rai Radio 2's airplay chart.

Tina Turner's subsequent success with "The Best" restored Tyler's confidence in choosing recording material, after both Hide Your Heart and its singles failed to match the commercial success of her previous work. She added that Turner "did it much better than I did".

Track listings
 European 7-inch single
 "The Best" – 4:15		
 "The Fire Below" – 5:08

 Dutch and UK 12-inch single
 "The Best" – 4:15
 "The Fire Below" – 5:08
 "Under Suspicion" – 4:24
		
 UK CD single
 "The Best" – 4:15
 "The Fire Below" – 5:08
 "Under Suspicion" – 4:24

Charts

Tina Turner version

In 1989, American singer and songwriter Tina Turner recorded a cover version of "The Best" for her seventh solo studio album, Foreign Affair (1989), with a saxophone solo played by Edgar Winter. Prior to recording the song, Tina Turner approached the songwriter Holly Knight and requested some changes: the addition of a bridge, which Turner felt was missing, and a key change.

Released as the lead single from Foreign Affair on 21 August 1989, the song was an international success, becoming a top-five hit in numerous countries. It is one of Turner's most recognizable tunes, often considered synonymous with the singer's name. The song was used in a Pepsi commercial featuring Turner, which also served as a promo for her Foreign Affair: The Farewell Tour sponsored by Pepsi. Additionally, the song was adopted by other brands for their advertising including Applebee's and T-Mobile, as well as the Australian rugby league competition the National Rugby League, for which it remains an iconic anthem more than 30 years after its release.

The song title is often colloquially mis-cited as "Simply the Best", reflecting a phrase in the chorus. This became so commonplace that the bracketed word 'Simply' was included in the titles for releases of some subsequent versions, and in the track listing for some Tina Turner compilation albums.

In 1990, the song was used for the New South Wales Rugby League premiership (NSWRL) promotional campaign. After appearing in NSWRL's ad a year earlier (with "What You Get Is What You See"), Tina Turner was invited to Sydney, Australia, to shoot the 1990 campaign ads, in which she appears alongside rugby league players, and perform the song at that year's Grand Final. The campaign featuring Tina Turner and the song is considered one of the greatest campaigns in sports marketing, which helped changed the perception of rugby league as a sport turning what was essentially a suburban game popular with working-class men into entertainment for the whole family. Such is the enduring popularity of the song as the rugby league anthem that it was featured again in the 2020 promotional campaign of NRL, more than 30 years after its release.

Critical reception
Bill Coleman from Billboard described the song as an "easy-paced pop offering which finds Turner's voice taking front and center stage." The Daily Vault's Mark Millan called it an "sing-along anthem". Pan-European magazine Music & Media stated that the singer's "dramatic range is fully utilised on this impressive and polished production (courtesy Dan Hartman and Turner)." A reviewer from People Magazine said it "features such pizza-box lyrics as "You're simply the best/ Better than all the rest/ Better than anyone/ Anyone I've ever met"." The reviewer also noted that Edgar Winter adds a saxophone solo "with bite". Pop Rescue called the song "flawless", adding that it was probably the fact that it's such a simple song that "helped it to become so widely popular."

Track listing
Worldwide 7-inch, cassette and CD single
"The Best" (Edit) – 4:08
"Undercover Agent for the Blues" – 5:17

UK 7-inch limited single
"The Best" (Edit) – 4:08
"What's Love Got to Do with It" – 3:49

European and UK CD and 12-inch single
"The Best" – 5:28
"Undercover Agent for the Blues" – 5:18
"Bold and Reckless" – 3:47

Australian 12-inch single
"The Best" (Extended Mighty Mix) – 6:37
"The Best" (Single Muscle Mix) – 4:17
"The Best" (Extended Muscle Mix) – 5:28

1993 Australian CD single
"The Best" (Edit) – 4:09
"The Best" (Extended Mighty Mix) – 6:37
"The Best" (Single Muscle Mix) – 4:17
"The Best" (Extended Muscle Mix) – 5:28

Charts

Weekly charts

Year-end charts

Certifications and sales

Tina Turner and Jimmy Barnes version

In 1992, Turner recorded "(Simply) The Best", a duet version of the song with Australian rock singer Jimmy Barnes, to promote that year's New South Wales Rugby League season in Australia. The single subsequently appeared on a limited edition bonus disc as part of the Australian release of her compilation album Simply the Best (1991).

Track listing
Australian 7-inch single
"(Simply) The Best" (Tina Turner and Jimmy Barnes) – 4:14
"(Simply) The Best" (Extended Version) – 5:29

Australian cassette and CD single
"(Simply) The Best" (Tina Turner and Jimmy Barnes) – 4:14
"River Deep, Mountain High" (Jimmy Barnes) – 3:37
"I'm a Lady" (Tina Turner) – 3:24
"(Simply) The Best" (Extended Version) – 5:29

Charts

Weekly charts

Year-end charts

References

1989 singles
1992 singles
Tina Turner songs
Bonnie Tyler songs
Jimmy Barnes songs
Male–female vocal duets
Songs written by Mike Chapman
Songs written by Holly Knight
Rock ballads
Song recordings produced by Desmond Child
1988 songs
Columbia Records singles
Mushroom Records singles
Capitol Records singles
PSV Eindhoven songs
Rangers F.C. songs
Number-one singles in Scotland